CIGA Healthcare is a British manufacturer of lateral flow assay diagnostic tests. It is under contract to the British government for the supply of AbC-19 rapid antibody tests, a test for the presence of IgG antibody against the SARS-CoV-2 spike protein, as part of the UK Rapid Test Consortium program.

Distribution
CIGA Healthcare will be responsible for assembly and distribution of the AbC-19 rapid antibody tests, and has also been awarded distribution in the US after recent FDA approval.

References

External links

Health care companies of the United Kingdom